Slate Falls Airport  is located  southwest of Slate Falls, Ontario, Canada.

Airlines and destinations

References

Certified airports in Kenora District